Indravarman or Indravarma (Kharosthi: 𐨀𐨁𐨎𐨡𐨿𐨪𐨬𐨪𐨿𐨨), also called Itravasu on his coinage, was an Indo-Scythian king of the Apracas, who ruled in the area of Bajaur in modern northwestern Pakistan. He was the son of Vispavarma. Indravarma had a son, Aspavarma, commander and later king, known from an inscription discovered at Taxila. Aspavarma also mentioned his father Indravarma on some of his coins.

Bajaur casket

Indravarman is mainly known from his dedicatory inscription on the Bajaur casket, an ancient reliquary from the area of Bajaur in ancient Gandhara, in the present-day Federally Administered Tribal Areas of Pakistan. It is dated to around 5-6 CE.

The inscription which is written in Kharoshthi, translates into English as:

The casket proves the involvement of the Scythian kings of the Apraca, in particular King Indravarman, in Buddhism.

Indravarma is also known from a seal inscription, which was discovered in Bajaur. He may have had a sister named Vasavadatta, who is known from the dedication of a water pot.

Silver reliquary

Indravarma is also known for another Buddhist inscription on a silver reliquary in which he mentions him and his father Vispavarma, who was not yet a king. The inscription which is written in Kharoshthi, translates into English as:

The date of the Silver reliquary is thought to be anterior to the Bajaur casket, as Indravarma describes his father as "Commander", rather than the later "King" title. It was probably dedicated in the end of the 1st century BCE.

See also
 Reliquary
 Apraca
 Bajaur

Notes

References
Baums, Stefan. 2012. “Catalog and Revised Texts and Translations of Gandharan Reliquary Inscriptions.” In: David Jongeward, Elizabeth Errington, Richard Salomon and Stefan Baums, Gandharan Buddhist Reliquaries, pp. 207–208, 233–234, Seattle: Early Buddhist Manuscripts Project (Gandharan Studies, Volume 1).
Baums, Stefan, and Andrew Glass. 2002– . Catalog of Gāndhārī Texts, nos. CKI 241 and CKI 242

Indo-Scythian kings
1st-century monarchs in Asia
History of Pakistan